Sawa, also known as Głuchówka, is a small river in Subcarpathian Voivodeship, Poland.

Description 
Its spring is located in Dynów Foothills near the villages of Husów, Handzlówka, and Błędowa Tyczyńska, and it tributes into the Wisłok river, near Łańcut. Its length is 22.95 km. The settlements located at the river are: Handzlówka, Albigowa, Wysoka, Sonina, Głuchów, and Łańcut.

References 

San basin
Rivers of Podkarpackie Voivodeship